Vijayamarie Technical Institute is a school in Karnataka. It was affected by the 2008 attacks on Christians in southern Karnataka in September 2008.

High schools and secondary schools in Karnataka